Guanghan North railway station is a railway station in Guanghan on the Chengdu–Mianyang–Leshan intercity railway and Xi'an–Chengdu high-speed railway.

References 

Railway stations in Sichuan